Jesse James Under the Black Flag is a 1921 American silent Western film directed and written by Franklin B. Coates. It is about the bandit Jesse James, who is portrayed by his son Jesse James Jr.

It is the prequel of Jesse James as the Outlaw, both released the same year and featured in theaters.

Cast
 Jesse James Jr. as Jesse James
 Franklin B. Coates as himself
 Harry Hoffman as Cole Younger
 James Neill as Robert Standing
 Diana Reed as Lucille James, daughter of Jesse James Jr.
 Jack Neil as Robert Standing, Lucille's Sweetheart
 Harry Hall as Charles William Quantrell
 Marguerite Hungerford as Zee Mimms, Mrs. Jesse James
 F.G. McCabe as Bloody Bill Anderson
 Dan Paterson as Murdock
 Sunshine Baker as Mrs. Sam Clifton
 Ralph Johnson as Judge Bowman
 Hortense Espey as Mrs. Bowman
 Jack Wall as Captain Arch Clements
 Mrs. Cart as Jesse's Mother
 William Baker as Jesse's Step-Father
 Frances Coffrey as Susan, Jesse's Sister
 Elmo Red Fox as Chief Red Fox

References

External links
 
 
 

1921 films
1921 Western (genre) films
1920s historical films
American black-and-white films
American historical films
Biographical films about Jesse James
Films directed by Franklin B. Coates
Silent American Western (genre) films
1920s American films